Corn Run is a tributary of the Susquehanna River in Columbia County, Pennsylvania, United States. Corn Run was historically known as Roberts Run. The stream is listed as a coldwater fishery.

Course
Corn Run begins near the community of Breezy Acres in Catawissa Township. It flows southwest for approximately half a mile before receiving an unnamed tributary and turning south for a short distance. The stream then picks up another unnamed tributary and turns west-southwest for some distance, receiving another unnamed tributary along the way. It eventually starts flowing parallel to State Route 3015 and turns south and enters Catawissa. In Catawissa, the stream turns east, crosses a railroad, and reaches its confluence with the Susquehanna River.

Geography
There are some steep slopes in the vicinity of the stream.

There are seven obstructions on Corn Run and they are assigned numbers between 31 and 37. The obstructions include a stone box, a concrete box, an iron culvert, and several others.

Watershed
Parts of the watershed are forested and there are also some ponds near the stream. However, the areas of the watershed that are within the stream's flood boundary are moderately populated residential areas.

A portion of Corn Run is in a development, which is known as Roberts Addition as of 1982.

The entire drainage basin of Corn Run is considered to be a coldwater fishery.

History and etymology
Corn Run was historically known as Roberts Run, after Moses Roberts, who was one of the earliest settlers of Catawissa. During a flood in 1904, bushels of corn were washed into the stream, causing it to be renamed Corn Run. The new name of the stream was popular among locals by 1915. However, it was still referred to as Roberts Run on some maps as late as the 1950s.

The Creasey Farm, which was owned by Nathan Creasey, was historically located on Corn Run.

See also
Catawissa Creek, next tributary of the Susquehanna River going downriver
Fishing Creek (North Branch Susquehanna River), next tributary of the Susquehanna River going upriver
List of rivers of Pennsylvania

References

Rivers of Columbia County, Pennsylvania
Rivers of Pennsylvania
Tributaries of the Susquehanna River